Lasiobolus is a genus of fungi in the family Ascodesmidaceae.

Species
Lasiobolus aurantiacus
Lasiobolus brachytrichus
Lasiobolus cainii
Lasiobolus capreoli
Lasiobolus cuniculi
Lasiobolus diversisporus
Lasiobolus dubius
Lasiobolus intermedius
Lasiobolus lasioboloides
Lasiobolus leporinus
Lasiobolus longisetosus
Lasiobolus macrotrichus
Lasiobolus microsporus
Lasiobolus minimus
Lasiobolus monascus
Lasiobolus oligotrichus
Lasiobolus papillatus
Lasiobolus ruber
Lasiobolus setosus
Lasiobolus trichoboloides
Lasiobolus vaccinus

References

External links

Pezizales genera
Pezizales